The International Forum on Strategic Technology (IFOST) is a nonprofit organization composed of member institutes located in Asia. Each year IFOST organizes and sponsors an international conference, hosted by member institutes in turn, on a variety of topics in academics, technology and regional policies affecting respective members. IFOST is a unique and identifiable forum not only for an international conference to link academia but also to facilitate cooperation between academia and industries even including policy makers on strategic technology. The first IFOST conference was held in Ulsan, Korea in 2006. The ninth one was hosted by Bangladesh in 2014. The IFOST headquarters is presently located at University of Ulsan (Korea).

The IFOST is co-sponsored by IEEE. For IFOST 2013, for example, there were 350 participants. Furthermore, 231 published papers were accepted for presentation and inclusion in the IEEE Xplore Digital Library, one of the largest scholarly research database containing over two million records that indexes, abstracts and provides full-text for articles and papers on computer science, electrical engineering, electronics, information technology and physical sciences.
IFOST 2014 was held on 21–23 October 2014 at the Chittagong University of Engineering and Technology at Chittagong, Bangladesh.

History
IFOST was formed in 2006 to promote multi-level collaboration among its member institutes, currently consisting of seven universities: University of Ulsan (Korea), Novosibisk State Technical University (Russia), Tomsk Polytechnic University (Russia), Harbin University Science and Technology (China), Mongolian University of Science and Technology (Mongolia), Chittagong University of Engineering and Technology (Bangladesh), and Universitas Gadjah Mada (Indonesia), and one research institute, Ulsan Technopark (Korea). Each member nominates a director to the Board of Directors, a body responsible for setting up broad policies and managing affairs relevant to IFOST.

Past conferences
Starting 2006, IFOST has had 9 successful events at 7 different universities in 6 different countries:
 2006 1st IFOST (Korea, University of Ulsan) : Participants 58, Published Papers 120.
 2007 2nd IFOST (Mongolia, Mongolian University of Science and Technology) : Participants 250, Published Papers 170.
 2008 3rd IFOST (Russia, Novosibirsk State Technical University / Tomsk Polytechnic University) : Participants 204, Published Papers 207.
 2009 4th IFOST (Vietnam, Hanoi University of Science and Technology) : Participants 290, Published Papers 275. 
 2010 5th IFOST (Korea, University of Ulsan) : Participants 132, Published Papers 310. 
 2011 6th IFOST (China, Harbin University of Science and Technology) : Participants 267, Published Papers 310. 
 2012 7th IFOST (Russia, Tomsk Polytechnic University) : Participants 197, Published Papers 377. 
 2013 8th IFOST (Mongolia, Mongolian University of Science and Technology) : Participants 350, Published Papers 231
 2014 9th IFOST (Bangladesh, Chittagong University of Engineering and Technology)

Next event
 Universitas Gadjah Mada will be the host for IFOST 2015 (10th IFOST). The main theme of IFOST 2015 is “Towards Sustainable Engineering and Technology”.

Current members
IFOST has following member institutes:
 Universitas Gadjah Mada (UGM) Indonesia
 Tomsk Polytechnic University (TPU) Russia 
 Novosibirsk State Technical University (NSTU) Russia 
 University of Ulsan (UOU) Korea 
 Ulsan Technopark (UTP) Korea 
 Harbin University of Science and Technology (HUST) China 
 Mongolian University of Science and Technology (MUST) Mongolia 
 Chittagong University of Engineering and Technology (CUET) Bangladesh

References

External links
 IFOST Home Page

Science conferences